Albertoppelia is an extinct genus of prawn which existed during the Late Jurassic period, named after Albert Oppel. It contains the single species Abertoppelia kuempeli. Fossils of Albertoppelia were recovered from the Eichstätt Formation (Solnhofen Group) in Bavaria, Germany.

References

Penaeidae
Jurassic crustaceans